SCREEN3 is a technology used and designed by Motorola to push news and information to mobile phones.

Functionality
The SCREEN3 feature functions by downloading headlines and displaying these to the user as part of the contents of the idle screen.  After the user has configured which feeds or channels are of interest, feed updates are continuously and automatically pushed to the handset via packet data transfers which happen in the background.

While viewing the small images and accompanying headlines ("bites") which scroll by on the screen, users can choose to view a snippet of the actual story ("the snack").  Users then are taken to a condensed summary version of the story or headline.  At this point, if the story is deemed sufficiently interesting, users can opt to view the full story ("the meal"), causing the web browser to be launched to retrieve the appropriate web page.

Billing is usually set up in such a way that users are not charged for headlines and text snippets pushed to the handset, and are instead only charged any per-byte data fees when actually viewing the full story.  Rates vary by carrier, but examples include US$0.01 per kilobyte, or US$19.99 for unlimited data access.

Availability
SCREEN3 became available in Motorola products starting with phones shipping near the end of 2005.  The technology is not available on all handsets, nor is it supported by all wireless carriers, so exact availability varies.  It also requires a data plan of some form, so customers with entry-level voice service plans will be unable to take advantage of this functionality.

Products advertised as supporting SCREEN3
Motorola KRZR K1
Motorola KRZR K3
Motorola MotoRokr E6
Motorola PEBL U6
Motorola RAZR V3
Motorola RAZR V3i
Motorola RAZR V3x
Motorola RAZR V3xx
Motorola RAZR V6
Motorola RAZR² V9
Motorola RIZR Z3
Motorola SLVR L7
Motorola V195
Motorola V360
Motorola V557
Motorola SLVR L9

Wireless carriers advertised as supporting SCREEN3
Cingular Wireless
Telefonica
China Mobile
ChungHwa Telecom
M1 (Singapore) (Discontinued support on 2008–03)
Optus (Australia)
3 (Australia)
Telstra (Australia)
AirTel India

Motorola Retail markets supporting SCREEN3
Australia
Hong Kong
India
Indonesia
United Kingdom
Taiwan

Motorola